The first battle of Öland took place on 30–31 May 1564 between the islands of Gotland and Öland, between a fleet of Allied ships, the Danes under Herluf Trolle and the Lübeckers under Friedrich Knebel, and a Swedish fleet of 23 or more ships under Jakob Bagge. It was an Allied victory.

Only some of the ships on each side were involved, the rest being unable to help due to the wind. On 30 May Fortuna was damaged and Lange Bark sunk, but on 31 May the Swedish ship Mars was boarded by Byens Løffue, Engel, and Fuchs before catching alight and exploding, killing most of its crew and 300 boarders. Jakob Bagge and his Second, were taken prisoner. Swedish casualties apart from in this ship were 101. Fleming took over the fleet and sailed it back to Älvsnabben, while the Danes sailed to Copenhagen.

Ships involved

Denmark/Lübeck 
 Fortuna (Danish flag)
 Byens Løffue 56
 Engel (Lübeck flag)
 Lange Bark (Lübeck) — sunk 30 May
 Arck
 Fuchs (Lübeck)
 other ships

Sweden 
 Mars 173 (flag) — blew up 31 May
 Elefant 65 (Fleming)
 Finska Svan 82
 Svenska Hektor 87
 19 or more other ships

References 
Kloth, Herbert: "Lübecks Seekriegswesen in der Zeit des nordischen 7-jährigen Krieges 1563–1570", Zeitschrift des Vereines für lübeckische Geschichte und Altertumskunde, Vol. 21 (1923), pp. 1–51, 185–256 plus Vol. 22 (1923–25), pp. 121–52 & 325–79

Rxternal links
 Copperprint engraving - First or second battle?

1564 in Denmark
Öland
History of Lübeck
Conflicts in 1564
Gotland